The following is a timeline of the history of the municipality of Amsterdam, Netherlands.

Prior to 17th century

 2700~2750 BC - age of neolithic shards of Bell Beaker culture pottery found under Rokin
 2200~2000 BC - age of granite grinding stone found under Damrak
 10th c. - Farmers settling at upstream Amstel
 1105 - Wolfger van Amstel mentioned in a document  as scultetus of "Amestelle" (Amstelland).
 1170 - All Saint's Flood made settlement possible at the banks of downstream Amstel 
 1213 - Founding Oude Kerk in this settlement
 1270 - Dam built in Amstel River (approximate date).
 1275 - "Amestelledamme" ('at the dam of Amstelland') appears in a document.
 1303 - Siege of Amsterdam
 1306 - Amsterdam granted city rights. Oude Kerk consecrated.
 1345 - 15 March: Alleged "Miracle of Amsterdam" occurs.
 1347 - Heilige Stede chapel built.
 1408 - Nieuwe Kerk (church) construction begins.
 1421 - Fire.
 1425 - Singel canal dug.
 1452 - Fire.
 1470 - Agnietenklooster built.
 1487 - Schreierstoren built.
 1490s - Brick city wall built.
 1516 - Montelbaanstoren built.
 1518 - Egelantier formed (approximate date).
 1535 - 10 May: Anabaptist riot occurs; "fanatics ran about the streets naked."
 1566 - Beeldenstorm.
 1568 - Amsterdam supports Catholics in the Dutch Revolt.
 1575 - Erven Lucas Bols in business.
 1578
 Alteratie shifts power from Catholics to Protestants.
  built.
 1585 - City expands beyond the Singel.
 1586 - Admiralty of Amsterdam formed.
 1596 - Rasphuis (prison) established.

17th century
 1601 - Goldsmith's guild established.
 1602 - Amsterdam Stock Exchange and Dutch East India Company founded.
 1603 - Hendrick de Keyser becomes city architect.
 1606 - Oost-Indisch Huis built.
 1607 - English Reformed Church established.
 1609 - Bank of Amsterdam established.
 1611 -  built.
 1613 - Grachtengordel development begins.
 1614 - Nieuwmarkt created.
 1617
 First Dutch Academy formed.
 Korenbeurs built.
 Town gate remodeled as Weigh House.
 1619 - Westerhal built.
 1620
 Munttoren and  built.
 English-language Corrant out of Italy, German, Etc. newspaper begins publication.
 1621 - Dutch West India Company founded.
 1622 - Cromhouthuizen built.
 1631 - Artist Rembrandt moves to Jodenbreestraat in Amsterdam.
 1632 - Athenaeum Illustre formed.
 1633 -  built.
 1637 - Schouwburg of Van Campen (theatre) built.
 1638
 Hortus Medicus founded.
  built.
 1642 - Rembrandt's artwork The Night Watch shown in the Kloveniersdoelen.
 1651 - St. Peter's Flood.
 1652 - 7 July:  burns down.
 1655 - New City Hall built on Dam Square.
 1662
 Blaeu's Atlas Maior published.
 1663 - Bubonic plague outbreak.
 1665 - New theatre opens.
 1672 - Johannes Hudde becomes mayor.
 1675 - Portuguese Synagogue built.
 1679 - Wynand-Fockink in business.
 1682 - Begijnhof Chapel and Amstelhof built.
 1683 - Society of Suriname established.
 1691 - Skinny Bridge built.
 1696 - Aansprekersoproer riots

18th century
 1748 
 Pachtersoproer riots 
 Demands from Doelistenmovement
 1765 -  founded.
 1774 - Theatre opens on the Leidseplein.
 1776 - Felix Meritis society and  established.
 1780 -  built.
 1785 - Seamen's Institute, and Society for Public Welfare organized.
 1787 - Prussians in power.
 1794
 Metz & Co established.
 Population: 217,024.
 1795 - January: French in power.
 1800 - Barrack of St. Charles built.

19th century
 1808
 Amsterdam becomes capital of Kingdom of Holland, client state of the French Empire.
 City Hall becomes the Royal Palace.
 Royal Institute of Sciences, Literature and Fine Arts founded.
 1813 - Oranje-Nassau Kazerne (military barrack) built.
 1814
 Amsterdam becomes capital of the Netherlands.
 Rijks-Museum relocates to the Trippenhuis building.
 Bank of the Netherlands headquartered in city.
 1815
 Doelen Hotel in business.
 Population: 180,179.
 1824 - Netherlands Trading Society headquartered in city.
 1825 
 North Holland Canal constructed.
 Amsterdamsche Stoomboot Maatschappij established
 1838 - Zoo opens.
 1839
 Amsterdam–Haarlem railway begins operating.
  opens.
 Arti et Amicitiae society organized.
 1840
 Coster Diamonds founded.
  (gate) built.
 1841 - Mozes en Aäronkerk (church) rebuilt.
 1843 -  opens.
 1845 -  built.
 1852 - Bijbels Museum founded.
 1853 - City "water supply" begins.
 1854 - Royal Asscher Diamond Company founded.
 1855 - Arti et Amicitiae constructed.
 1856
 Amsterdam–Arnhem railway constructed.
 De Eendracht war memorial erected.
 Koninklijke Nederlandse Stoomboot-Maatschappij (shipping company) established.
 1862 - Bloemenmarkt founded.
 1863 - Museum Fodor opens.
 1866 - Population: 264,498.
 1867
 Heineken brewery built.
 Amstel Hotel opens.
 1869 - Netherlands Bank building constructed.
 1870
 Rijksakademie, De Bijenkorf shop, and Amstel Brewery founded.
 Stoomvaart Maatschappij Nederland (steamship line) in business.
 1874
 Amsterdam–Zutphen railway constructed.
 Amsterdamse Toneelschool established.
 1875 -  housing association formed.
 1876
 North Sea Canal opens.
 Population: 281,944.
 1877 - Municipal University of Amsterdam and Teekenschool voor Kunstambachten founded.
 1878 - Den Helder–Amsterdam railway begins operating.
 1880 - Vrije Universiteit established.
 1881
 Telephone in operation.
  housing built in Czaar Peterbuurt.
 Stille Omgang revived.
 1882 - Spui square created.
 1883
 May: International Colonial and Export Exhibition opens.
  (theatre) built.
  (park) laid out.
 1884
 Amsterdamsch Conservatorium founded.
 Population: 361,326.
 1885 - Rijksmuseum opens.
 1886 - July:  eel riot occurs.
 1887
 Orange riots..
 Elsevier publisher in business.
 Basilica of St. Nicholas built.
 1888 - Concertgebouw built, and Royal Concertgebouw Orchestra founded.
 1889 - Amsterdam Centraal railway station opens.
 1890 - Victoria Hotel, Amsterdam in business.
 1893 - Economic unrest.
 1894 - Stadsschouwburg rebuilt.
 1895
  (exhibit) held.
 Museum Willet-Holthuysen and Catholic Ignatius Gymnasium (school) established.
 1900
 Gemeentetram Amsterdam tramway established.
  historical society and AFC Ajax football club formed.
 Population: 523,557.

20th century

1900s-1940s
 1903
 Railroad Strike.
 Beurs van Berlage built.
 1904 - August: International Socialist Congress held.
 1906 - Amsterdam Wind Orchestra ATH formed.
 1907 -  cinema and Het Houten Stadion (stadium) open.
 1911 - Rembrandt House Museum opens.
 1915
  department store built.
  (publisher) in business.
 1917
 .
 Amsterdam-Zuid development begins per Plan Zuid.
 1919
 Public library opens.
 Het Schip apartment building erected.
 Disteldorp and Vogeldorp areas built in Amsterdam-Noord.
 Population: 647,120.
 1920
 Construction of the Defence Line of Amsterdam completed.
 Muzieklyceum and Rialto cinema established.
 1921
 Buiksloot, Nieuwendam, Ransdorp, Sloten, and Watergraafsmeer annexed.
 Tuschinski cinema built.
 1923 - Tuindorp Oostzaan area built.
 1924.
 Institute of Applied Art formed.
 National Vocational School for Pastry Chefs opens.
 1925 - Tooneelmuseum (stage museum) founded.
 1926
 Amsterdam Museum established.
 Royal Tropical Institute building constructed
 HEMA (store) in business on Kalverstraat.
 1927 - American Women's Club Amsterdam founded.
 1928 - Summer Olympics held.
 1929 - Palace of National Industry burns down.
 1932 - Joods Historisch Museum opens.
 1933 - Alhambra Theater opens.
 1934
 July: .
 Allard Pierson Museum opens.
 1935
 International Institute for Social History established.
  cinema opens.
 1936 -  Theatre built.
 1939
 Amsterdam Amstel railway station opens.
  built.
 1940
 German occupation begins.
 Het Parool newspaper begins publication.
 1941
 February strike.
  (Jewish emigration bureau) begins operating.
 1943
 27 March: .
 July: .
 1944 - 4 August: Frank family arrested.
 1945
 18 January: Executions on the Fusilladeplaats Rozenoord begin.
 5 May: German occupation ends.
 7 May: Shooting on Dam square, Amsterdam.
  opens.
 De Volkskrant newspaper in publication.
 1946 - Dutch Historic Film Archive founded.
 1947
 Anne Frank's Diary published.
 Holland Festival begins.

1950s-1990s
 1952
 May: Amsterdam–Rhine Canal opens.
  active.
 Filmmuseum founded.
 1956 - National Monument erected in Dam Square.
 1957 - Horecava hospitality trade fair begins.
 1958 - Netherlands Film and Television Academy founded.
 1960
 Anne Frank House museum established on the Prinsengracht.
  (school) founded.
 Uitzendbureau Amstelveen employment agency in business.
 1961 - Amsterdam RAI Exhibition and Convention Centre opens.
 1962 - Hilton Hotel in business.
 1965 - Counterculture Provo (movement) begins.
 1966
 13–14 June:  (labor unrest) occurs.
 Weesperkarspel annexed.
 1967 - Catholic Theological University of Amsterdam established.
 1968
 Art & Project gallery opens.
 Theaterschool founded.
 1969
 March: Bed-In for Peace held.
 May: Student protest occurs at the University of Amsterdam .
 STEIM cultural venue established.
 1970 - Population: 807,095.
 1971 - Amsterdam Bijlmer ArenA railway station opens.
 1972 - In-Out Centre opens.
 1973 - Van Gogh Museum opens.
 1975
 Flag of Amsterdam design adopted.
 Rainbow Foundation, De Appel art centre, and Other Books and So founded.
 Amsterdam Marathon and SAIL Amsterdam begin.
 1976 - Sweelinck Conservatorium formed.
 1977
 9 May: Hotel Polen fire.
 Amsterdam Metro begins operating.
 Uitmarkt begins
 1978 - MonteVideo founded.
 1979
 Amsterdam Baroque Orchestra founded.
  (prison) closed.
 1981 - 21 November: Protest against stationing of NATO missiles.
 1984
 Social unrest.
 Amsterdam Fantastic Film Festival begins.
 1985 - Annual contemporary art fair begins.
 1986
 Amsterdam–Schiphol railway begins operating.
 Stopera opera hall opens.
 1987 - Amsterdamse Poort (shopping centre) opens.
 1988
 International Documentary Film Festival Amsterdam begins.
 Stopera city hall opens.
 1990 - Population: 695,221.
 1991
 Museum Geelvinck-Hinlopen established.
 Museum Jan van der Togt opens.
 1992
 4 October: Airplane crash in Bijlmermeer.
 Miniature Museum founded.
 1993 - La Rive and Boom Chicago founded.
 1994
 Conservatorium van Amsterdam and Prostitution Information Center founded.
 SMART Project Space opens.
 1996
 Amsterdam Gay Pride begins.
 Amsterdam Arena built.
 1997
 2 October: EU treaty signed in city.
 Henk Sneevlietweg metro station opens.
 IJburg residential archipelago construction begins.
 1999 - OT301 squat begins.
 2000
 Prostitution in the Netherlands legalized.
 Euronext founded.

21st century

 2001
 1 April: First legalized same-sex marriage in the Netherlands occurs.
 Foam Fotografiemuseum Amsterdam and Heineken Music Hall open.
 Job Cohen becomes mayor.
 2006 - Amsterdam Film eXperience begins.
 2007
 KLIK! Amsterdam Animation Festival begins.
 Diamond Museum Amsterdam opens.
 Centrale Bibliotheek moves into new building.
 Amsterdam City Archives relocates to De Bazel building.
 De Schreeuw memorial erected in the Oosterpark.
 2008 - Amsterdam Holendrecht railway station opens.
 2009 - Hermitage Amsterdam opens.
 2010 - Eberhard van der Laan becomes mayor.
 2012
 21 April: Sloterdijk train collision.
 EYE Film Institute Netherlands opens.
 2014
 17 July: Malaysia Airlines Flight 17 departs from Amsterdam, later crashes in Ukraine.
 2014 Amsterdam drug deaths occur.
 2015
 February: University of Amsterdam Bungehuis and Maagdenhuis occupations (student protest) occur.
 Regeneration of Frederik Hendrikplantsoen
2019
December: The start of Stichting Nederlied for special dutch language theatre

Images

See also
 History of Amsterdam
 List of mayors of Amsterdam
 
 Walls of Amsterdam
 Expansion of Amsterdam since the 19th century
 
 Timelines of other municipalities in the Netherlands: Breda, Delft, Eindhoven, Groningen, Haarlem, The Hague, 's-Hertogenbosch, Leiden, Maastricht, Nijmegen, Rotterdam, Utrecht
 History of urban centers in the Low Countries

References

This article incorporates information from the Dutch Wikipedia.

Bibliography

External links

  (map that includes Amsterdam)
 Europeana. Items related to Amsterdam, various dates

Amsterdam
Years in the Netherlands
[[Category:Timelines of capitals|Amsterdam